John Cole may refer to:

Politics
John Cole (fl. 1372–1394), MP for Wilton
John Cole (born c.1376) (c. 1376–?), MP for Devon 1417-23
Sir John Cole, 1st Baronet (died 1691), Irish politician
John Cole, 1st Baron Mountflorence (1709–1767), Irish politician
John Cole, 2nd Earl of Enniskillen (1768–1840), Irish peer and Member of Parliament
 John Lowry Cole (1813–1882), Irish Conservative politician
John N. Cole (1863–1922), U.S. politician in the Massachusetts House of Representatives
John James Cole (died 1959), Irish independent politician from Cavan
John Copeland Cole (died 1987), Irish politician, Senator from 1957 to 1969
John Cole (Canadian politician) (born 1942), Canadian politician

Sports
 John Cole (bobsleigh) (1929–1993), American bobsledder
 John Cole (cricketer, born 1907) (1907–1997), English cricketer and British Army officer
 John Cole (cricketer, born 1933) (1933–2014), South African cricketer
 John Cole (footballer) (born 1941), Scottish footballer
 John Cole (American football), American football fullback

Other
 John Cole (priest), Archdeacon of Totnes between 1580 and 1583
 John Cole (pirate) (died 1718), known more for the unusual cargo of his pirate ship than for his piracy
 John Cole (judge) (1715–1777), Chief Justice of the Rhode Island Supreme Court from 1764 to 1765
 John Cole (academic) (1758–1819), Anglican priest and administrator at the University of Oxford
 John Cole (music publisher) (1774–1855), American composer, music publisher, collector of sacred music
 John Cole (antiquary) (1792–1848), English bookseller, publisher and antiquary
 John Jenkins Cole (1815–1897), English architect
 John Cole (architect), Northern Irish architect
 Tom Cole (farmer) (John Thomas Cole, 1854–1927), Australian dairy farmer and cattle breeder
 John Cole (journalist) (1927–2013), Northern Irish journalist and broadcaster, BBC political editor
 John Cole (geographer) (1928–2020), Australian-born British geography professor
 John Y. Cole (born 1940), librarian and historian of the Library of Congress
 John Cole (choreographer) (born 1988), Zimbabwean dance choreographer, dancer, actor, TV presenter and artists director
 John Cole (photographer) (1923–1995), English fashion and advertising photographer
 John T. Cole (1895–1975), United States Army general

See also
 Jack Cole (disambiguation)
 Jack Coles (disambiguation)
 John Coles (disambiguation)
 Jon Cole (disambiguation)
 Jonathan Cole (disambiguation)